Stoke Prior is a village in the civil parish of Stoke in the Bromsgrove district of Worcestershire. The parish includes the settlement of Stoke Wharf and hamlet of Woodgate, along with neighbouring Stoke Heath.

History

In 1086 Stoke Prior was listed in the Domesday Book as Stoche, in the ancient hundred of Came in Worcestershire. The landlord and tenant-in-chief was the bishop of Worcester St Mary.

When the hundred of Halfshire was formed (probably in the mid-12th century), Stoke Prior was one of three Came manors annexed to the hundred of Oswaldslow.

In the 19th century, Stoke Prior was closely associated with the industrialist John Corbett. In 1853, after he had sold his share of the family canal business, he purchased disused salt works in Stoke Prior from the British Alkali Company. Corbett brought all the innovations of the industrial revolution to mechanise and commercialise the business, soon making his salt workings the largest in Europe and built a great fortune.

The Parish Church of St Michael and All Angels dates from the 12th century.

Economy
The Worcester and Birmingham Canal passes through the parish. In the 19th century, John Corbett turned the salt works in Stoke Prior into one of the largest in Europe. The tall chimney of the Stoke Salt Works was for many years a dominating landmark. Stoke Prior still houses the headquarters of LG Harris Ltd, a paint brush and decorators tool manufacturer (known locally as "Harris Brush" or just "The Brush").

Sports
Stoke Prior houses two football teams, Stoke Prior FC and Stoke Prior Youth FC, the main team being managed by Jamie Maycroft and the youth team being managed by Alan Banks.  Both teams play their home games at Stoke Prior Sports and Country Club, with the adult team playing their games in the Bromsgrove and District Football League, whilst the youth team play in the Central Warwickshire Youth Football League.

Notable people
Zoë Lister was born in Stoke Prior.
John Corbett, the Salt King, buried in the churchyard of St Michaels, Stoke Prior.

Gallery

References

Villages in Worcestershire
Bromsgrove